The Sticht Range is a mountain range located in the West Coast region of Tasmania, Australia.
	
It was named after Robert Carl Sticht, the manager of the Mount Lyell Mining and Railway Company.

It was affected by the 2016 Tasmanian bushfires

Features and access
The range can be viewed from the Hydro Tasmania built road (B24) at Lake Plimsoll. It is a cambrian formation range.

The threatened plant Orites milliganii, a member of the family Proteaceae, may be located in the range.

See also

List of highest mountains of Tasmania

References

Further reading

External links 
 West Coast Range on Google Maps
 https://web.archive.org/web/20060821115426/http://www.parks.tas.gov.au/wha/wherein/detail.html - context of World Heritage Area

Mountain ranges of Tasmania
West Coast Range
2016 Tasmanian bushfires